Devosia limi is a Gram-negative, non-spore-forming, rod-shaped bacteria from the genus of Devosia which was isolated from commercial nitrifying inoculum in Belgium.

References

External links
Type strain of Devosia limi at BacDive -  the Bacterial Diversity Metadatabase

 

Hyphomicrobiales
Bacteria described in 2005